Ron Silverman is an American actor, film and television producer and writer, who later became the Dean of Studies at the American Film Institute. He attended the University of Arizona. He began his career as a writer for The Wild Wild West and other United Artists programs and pilots, before transitioning into films.

Producing credits
 Stoney Burke (1963, associate, 3 episodes)
 OK Crackerby! (1965–66, associate, 11 episodes)
 Buster and Billie (1974)
 Lifeguard (1976)
 Brubaker (1980)
 Krull (1983)
 The Last Innocent Man (1987, TV movie)
 Shoot to Kill (1988)

References

American film producers
American television producers
American screenwriters
Living people
Year of birth missing (living people)